The Commander of Royal Air Force, is the top most authority in the Royal Saudi Air Force.

Commanders
 Air Force Director
 Captain Abdullah Al Mandili
 Major Rashid Al Saleh
 Major General Ibrahim Al Tassan (1950–1959)

 Commander of the Air Force
 Lieutenant General  acting (1959–1966)
 Major General Hashim bin Said Hashim (1966–1972)

Commander of the Saudi Royal Air Force

See also
 Armed Forces of Saudi Arabia

Notes

References

Royal Saudi Air Force
 Saudi Arabia